Victor Joseph Dzau  (born 23 October 1945) is a Chinese-American doctor and academic. He serves as the President of the United States National Academy of Medicine (formerly the Institute of Medicine) of the United States National Academy of Sciences. He was previously the president and CEO of Duke University Medical Center.

Biography

Dzau was born in Shanghai, Republic of China. His father owned a chemical manufacturing company. He and his family fled to Hong Kong to escape from the civil war of China. He received both his Bachelor of Science degree in Biology and his M.D. from McGill University in Montreal, Canada.

A leading cardiovascular scholar, Dzau was the Hersey Professor of the Theory and Practice of Medicine at Harvard Medical School and served as Chairman of the Department of Medicine at Harvard Medical School's Brigham and Women's Hospital, as well as Chairman of the Department of Medicine at Stanford University. He then became the Chancellor for Health Affairs at Duke University and President and CEO of the Duke University Medical Center. Dzau is currently the James B. Duke Professor of Medicine at Duke University. In July 2014, he was elected for a six-year term (renewable) as President of the then Institute of Medicine (now the National Academy of Medicine). He is a member of the National Academy of Medicine, The American Academy of Arts and Sciences, and the European Academy of Sciences and Arts. He was the previous Chairman of the National Institutes of Health (NIH) Cardiovascular Disease Advisory Committee, and he served on the Advisory Committee to the Director of NIH.

Dzau has made a significant impact on medicine through seminal research in cardiovascular medicine and genetics, his pioneering work in the discipline of vascular medicine, and his leadership in health care innovation.  His seminal research laid the foundation for the development of angiotensin-converting-enzyme (ACE) inhibitors, which are used globally for the treatment of high blood pressure and congestive heart failure.  He pioneered gene therapy for vascular disease, being the first to introduce DNA decoy molecules to block transcriptions as gene therapy in humans.

Dzau's wife, Ruth, is the president of The Second Step, a nonprofit charitable organization that provides housing and transnational programs for domestic violence victims. They have two daughters, Jacqueline and Merissa. Dzau is on the honor roll of the Jewish Federation of Durham Chapel Hill and has been a speaker at the Federation's Ignite talks.

Honors and awards
 Eight honorary doctorate degrees.
 2004 Named Distinguished Scientist of the American Heart Association
 2004 Max Delbrück Medal, Berlin, Germany
 2005 Ellis Island Medal of Honor
 2012 Henry Freisen International Prize
 2014 Singapore Public Service Medal
 2019 Foreign member of the Chinese Academy of Engineering
2019 Honorary Citizen Award (Singapore)

References

Living people
1945 births
McGill University Faculty of Medicine alumni
Alumni of King's College London
Duke University faculty
Harvard Medical School faculty
Hong Kong scientists
Hong Kong Jews
Chinese Civil War refugees
Chinese Jews
Jewish American scientists
Stanford University School of Medicine faculty
Fellows of the American Academy of Arts and Sciences
Members of the European Academy of Sciences and Arts
Educators from Shanghai
People of Chinese-Jewish descent
Recipients of the Pingat Bakti Masyarakat
Scientists from Shanghai
Chinese emigrants to the United States
Foreign members of the Chinese Academy of Engineering
Honorary Citizens of Singapore
McGill University Faculty of Science alumni
American health care chief executives
21st-century American Jews
Members of the National Academy of Medicine